Whakapara  is a village and rural community north of Whangarei, in the Whangarei District and Northland Region of New Zealand's North Island.

The village includes the Whakapara Marae and Te Ihi o Nehua meeting house, a meeting place of the Ngāpuhi hapū of Ngāti Hao and Ngāti Hau.

References

Whangarei District
Populated places in the Northland Region